First Lutheran Church, or variants therof, can refer to:

Canada
 First Evangelical Lutheran Church of Toronto

United States (by state)

Alaska
 First Lutheran Church (Ketchikan, Alaska)

California
 First Lutheran Church of Venice, Los Angeles

Connecticut
  First Lutheran Church of the Reformation, New Britain, listed on the National Register of Historic Places
  First Lutheran Church, Ellington (formerly located in Rockville)

Iowa
 First Lutheran Church (St. Ansgar, Iowa)

Kentucky
 First Lutheran Church (Louisville, Kentucky), listed on the National Register of Historic Places

Massachusetts
 First Lutheran Church and School (Holyoke, MA)

Minnesota
 First Lutheran Church (Winthrop, Minnesota)

New York
 First Lutheran Church (Albany, New York)

Ohio
 First Reformed (now First Church of the Resurrection) and First Lutheran Church (Canton, Ohio) churches of Canton, Ohio, jointly listed on the National Register of Historic Places
 First Lutheran Church (Dayton, Ohio)
 First Lutheran Church (Springfield, Ohio)

South Dakota
 Bradley First Lutheran Church

Wisconsin
 First Lutheran Church (Middleton, Wisconsin)